The Ranfurly Shield, colloquially known as the Log o' Wood, is a trophy in New Zealand's domestic rugby union competition. First played for in 1904, the Ranfurly Shield is based on a challenge system, rather than a league or knockout competition as with most football trophies. The holding union must defend the Shield in challenge matches, and if a challenger defeats them, they become the new holder of the Shield.

The '80s saw the shield change hands four times among five teams. The decade began and ended with Auckland holding the shield. Notably, Auckland began their record 61 shield defences in 1985.

Fixtures

1980

1981

1982

1983

1984

1985

1986

1987

1988

1989

References

External links
Ranfurly Shield
Ranfurly Shield | New Zealand Rugby History

Ranfurly Shield
Rugby union trophies and awards
New Zealand rugby union competitions
1980 in New Zealand rugby union
1981 in New Zealand rugby union
1982 in New Zealand rugby union
1983 in New Zealand rugby union
1984 in New Zealand rugby union
1985 in New Zealand rugby union
1986 in New Zealand rugby union
1987 in New Zealand rugby union
1988 in New Zealand rugby union
1989 in New Zealand rugby union